Beyaz Ölüm is a 1983 Turkish crime drama film, directed by Halit Refiğ and starring Tarik Akan, Ahu Tugba, and Yaprak Özdemiroglu.

References

External links
Beyaz Ölüm at the Internet Movie Database

1983 films
Turkish crime drama films
1983 crime drama films
Films directed by Halit Refiğ
1980s Turkish-language films